Crown Hill is an unincorporated community in Kanawha County, West Virginia, United States. Crown Hill once had a post office, which closed on February 1, 1997.

References

Unincorporated communities in Kanawha County, West Virginia
Unincorporated communities in West Virginia
Coal towns in West Virginia
Populated places on the Kanawha River